The governor of Marinduque, is the chief executive of the provincial government of Marinduque

Provincial Governors (1899-2025)

References

Governors of Marinduque
Marinduque